Janet Lilo (born 1982) is a visual artist from New Zealand.

Lilo was born in 1982 in the Auckland region of New Zealand and is of Tainui, Ngāpuhi, Samoan, and Niue descent. She received an MA in Art and Design from the Auckland University of Technology in 2007. The title of her masters thesis was Editing identity: Lost and found in translation.

A social commentator, Lilo's work uses digital photography, video, and multimedia installations to explore issues of popular culture. She utilises monitors and projections, displaying her work in gallery spaces, buildings, shop windows, and online.

Lilo has exhibited in solo shows in New Zealand, the Cook Islands, and Japan. She has exhibited internationally in group shows in Australia, Taiwan, Japan, Indonesia, France, Germany, and the United States of America. Lilo's video installation 'ParkLife' was part of the City Gallery Wellington's exhibition Telecom Prospect 2007: New Art New Zealand.

In 2009, Lilo received the JENESYS (Japan East Asia Network of Exchange of Students and Youths) residency in Sapporo.

In 2011 she received the Contemporary Pacific Art Award in the Creative New Zealand Arts Pasifika Awards.

In 2013, her installation Right of Way was presented at Artspace Aotearoa as part of the fifth Auckland Triennial, curated by Hou Hanru.

In 2016, she had a significant solo exhibition titled Janet Lilo: Status Update, at Te Uru Waitākere Contemporary Gallery in Auckland. It was a survey of the last 10 years of her work which included a collage of 10,000 photographs and a book.

Lilo's public artworks include a series of large-scale 'banana lightboxes' on Auckland's Karangahape Road, which are collectively titled Don't Dream it's Over.

Lilo received the 2017 annual commission from the Auckland Festival of Photography.

Lilo's works are held in important public collections, including Auckland Art Gallery and Te Papa Tongarewa.

References

Further reading 
Artist files for Nicola Farquhar are held at:
 Angela Morton Collection, Takapuna Library 
 E. H. McCormick Research Library, Auckland Art Gallery Toi o Tāmaki 
 Hocken Collections Uare Taoka o Hākena

External links 
 Official website

1982 births
Ngāpuhi people
New Zealand people of Samoan descent
New Zealand people of Niuean descent
People from the Auckland Region
Auckland University of Technology alumni
21st-century New Zealand women artists
Living people